August Hobl (born April 13, 1931) is a German former professional Grand Prix motorcycle road racer from Germany. His best year was in 1956 when he rode a DKW motorcycle to finish the season ranked third in the 350cc world championship behind the Moto Guzzi teammates Bill Lomas and Dickie Dale.

References

External links
August Hobl's profile 

German motorcycle racers
125cc World Championship riders
250cc World Championship riders
350cc World Championship riders
1931 births
Living people